Anton Lepola (born 24 July 1996) is a Finnish professional footballer who plays for FC Haka, as a goalkeeper.

Career
On 5 December 2018, Lepola signed with TPS.

In March 2023, Lepola signed for FC Haka following three seasons with KTP.

References

1996 births
Living people
Finnish footballers
Åbo IFK players
Turun Palloseura footballers
Salon Palloilijat players
IFK Mariehamn players
Kotkan Työväen Palloilijat players
FC Haka players
Ykkönen players
Kakkonen players
Veikkausliiga players
Association football goalkeepers